"In Your Eyes" is a song by American singer George Benson, released as a single in 1983. It entered the UK Singles Chart on 24 September 1983 and reached a peak position of number 7. The song remained on the chart for 10 weeks. It was written by Michael Masser (music) and Dan Hill (lyrics), and was initially recorded by Hill for his 1983 album Love in the Shadows. It was also covered by Jeffrey Osborne in 1986. Hill would re-record the song in 1993 as a duet with Rique Franks, on the album Let Me Show You - Greatest Hits and More.

Chart history 
 George Benson

 Jeffrey Osborne

Other versions 
In 1984, Regine Velasquez (formerly known as Chona Velasquez) sang the song as her winning piece in Ang Bagong Kampeon. Fifteen years later, she recorded the song for her covers album R2K.

References 

1983 songs
1983 singles
1986 singles
Dan Hill songs
George Benson songs
Jeffrey Osborne songs
Pop ballads
Contemporary R&B ballads
Songs written by Michael Masser
Songs written by Dan Hill
Warner Records singles